The Martin House is a historic residence in the Mount Washington neighborhood of Cincinnati, Ohio, United States. Built in 1847, the house is composed of two pieces: the original section, located in the back; and the front, built in 1852. Between the two components, it features elements of the Greek Revival and Federal architectural styles.

In 1979, the Martin House was listed on the National Register of Historic Places, because of its status as a well-preserved example of the area's architecture.  By this point, the house was owned by a religious organization and was also known as the "Heritage House;" it received national recognition because it had almost never been altered after the construction of the front component, and few other houses in the area built at a similar time retained so many of their original components.

References

Houses completed in 1847
Federal architecture in Ohio
Greek Revival houses in Ohio
Houses in Cincinnati
Houses on the National Register of Historic Places in Ohio
National Register of Historic Places in Cincinnati
1847 establishments in Ohio